The term Mud Bowl can refer to various sporting events (American Football) which occur or have occurred in muddy conditions, including:

 The 38th Grey Cup championship game played in Toronto on November 25, 1950, in which the Toronto Argonauts defeated the Winnipeg Blue Bombers 13–0.
 A 1977 NFC playoff game in which the Minnesota Vikings defeated the Los Angeles Rams, 14–7 played on December 26, 1977.

 The AFC Championship Game played on January 23, 1983, in which the Miami Dolphins defeated the New York Jets, 14–0.
 A 2007 Monday Night Football game played on November 26, 2007, in which the Pittsburgh Steelers defeated the Miami Dolphins, 3–0.
 A 2019 NFL game played in Washington D.C. on October 20, 2019, in which the San Francisco 49ers shut out the Washington Redskins, 9–0.
 Various non-professional American football games played on intentionally muddied fields.